Prohepialus is an extinct genus of insect of uncertain phylogenetic placement. It was originally identified as a moth in the family Hepialidae; however, Simonsen, Wagner & Heikkilä (2019) considered it more likely to be a symphytan wasp. It contains only one species, Prohepialus incertus, which was described from a Thanetian crater lake diatomite (Paleocene) in Menat (Puy-de-Dôme), France. A second specimen is known from the Bembridge Marls (Eocene) in the United Kingdom.

References

Fossil Lepidoptera
Fossil taxa described in 1940
†
Paleocene life
Eocene insects
Prehistoric insects of Europe
†